Karen Akunowicz (born September 17, 1978) is an American chef, cookbook author, and television personality. Karen Akunowicz is a Top Chef television alum and was the 2018 James Beard Award, for "Best Chef: Northeast". She is based in Boston, Massachusetts.

Frontrunner for Season 13 of Top Chef Karen Akunowicz is the chef and proprietor of Fox & the Knife enoteca in Boston, which was named one of FOOD & WINE magazine's, Eater National's, Condé Nast Traveler's, and Thrillist's best new restaurants in America for 2019. Karen won a 2018 James Beard Foundation Award for Best Chef: Northeast and was awarded Boston Magazine's Best Chef after participating on the California season. She earned international job experience as the chef at L'Avian Blu in Modena, Italy, after earning degrees from the University of Massachusetts and the Cambridge School of Culinary Arts.

Early life and education
Akunowicz was born and raised in Kearny, New Jersey. She graduated from Kearny High School in 1996.

After graduating from the University of Massachusetts Amherst, she moved to Boston. While waiting tables, Akunowicz considered applying to graduate school for social work, but she decided to go to culinary school instead, attending the Cambridge School of Culinary Arts.

Career 
Akunowicz worked at Boston restaurants Via Matta and Oleana before becoming the executive chef and a partner at Joanne Chang's Myers+Chang. She was nominated for a James Beard Award in 2015, and she won the title of Best Chef: Northeast in 2018.

Akunowicz co-authored a cookbook published in 2017, Myers+Chang at Home: Recipes from the Beloved Boston Eatery.

In 2019, Akunowicz opened her own restaurant, Fox & the Knife, an Italian restaurant in South Boston. In 2019, Fox and the Knife was named Best New Restaurant in America by Food and Wine Magazine and Eater International. In 2020, it was given the same honor by USA Today. Fox & the Knife was also nominated for the James Beard Award for Best New Restaurant in America in 2019 and 2020.

In November 2021, Akunowicz opened her second restaurant, Bar Volpe, in South Boston. It focuses on Southern Italian cuisine.

In January 2022, The Boston Globe published an article about an outbreak of COVID-19 cases that spread between Akunowicz's two South Boston restaurants, Fox & the Knife and the newly opened Bar Volpe.

Television appearances 
In 2015, Akunowicz was a contestant on season 13 of Top Chef.

Akunowicz was a guest judge on Season 6 of Top Chef Canada in 2019. In 2020, Akunowicz competed on Top Chef: All-Stars L.A.

In 2022, Akunowicz competed in Season 3 of Guy Fieri's Tournament of Champions.

Personal life

Akunowicz identifies as a queer femme. In 2014, she married her partner, LJ Johnson. In late July 2022, Akunowicz announced she was pregnant with her first child due in September 2022.

References

External links
Fox & the Knife

1978 births
Living people
Kearny High School (New Jersey) alumni
People from Kearny, New Jersey
University of Massachusetts Amherst alumni
American women chefs
LGBT people from Massachusetts
Top Chef contestants
James Beard Foundation Award winners
Businesspeople from Boston
Chefs from Massachusetts
Chefs from New Jersey
LGBT people from New Jersey
LGBT chefs
American cookbook writers
Women cookbook writers
21st-century American women